Kermia canistra is a species of sea snail, a marine gastropod mollusk in the family Raphitomidae.

Description
The length of the shell attains 12 mm.

(Original description) The subulate shell is rather solid. The adult shell contains seven whorls. Its colour is irregularly disposed ; on a ground of buff are broad white vertical stripes, a few narrow distant chestnut stripes, and a narrow white peripheral belt. The sculpture consists of eighteen spiral cords and twenty-two radial riblets. Within the outer lip are ten small and short plications.

Distribution
This marine species occurs from the Gulf of Carpentaria to Queensland, Australia; also off the Philippines

References

 Cernohorsky, W.O. 1978. Tropical Pacific marine shells. Sydney : Pacific Publications 352 pp., 68 pls.
 Kay, E.A. & Johnson, S. 1987. Mollusca of Enewetak Atoll. pp. 105–148 in Devaney, D.M., Reese, E.S., Burch, B.L. & Helfrich, P. (eds). The Natural History of Enewetak Atoll, Volume 2. Biogeography and Systematics. Oak Ridge, Tenn. : U.S. Department of Energy, Office of Energy Research, Office of Health and Environmental Research, Ecological Research Division 343 pp.

External links
 
 Gastropods.com: Pseudodaphnella canistra

canistra
Gastropods described in 1922